The Chisos Mountains, also known as the Chisos, are a mountain range located in the Big Bend area of the Trans-Pecos region of Texas, United States. The mountain system covers 40 square miles (104 square km) and is contained entirely within the boundaries of Big Bend National Park, making it the only mountain range in the United States fully contained within a national park. The Chisos Mountains are the southernmost mountain range in the mainland United States.

The Chisos Mountains were created by volcanic activity during the Eocene Epoch 35-44 million years ago.

Location

The Chisos Mountains are located in Big Bend National Park. The range of mountains extends twenty miles from Punta de la Sierra in the southwest to Panther Junction in the northeast. An extensive trail system and permit-required backcountry campsites are maintained by Big Bend National Park for its visitors. The Northeast Rim and Southeast Rim trails are closed from February 1 through May 31 along with some of the backcountry campsites along these trails to protect the local peregrine falcon population.

The mountain area is partly forested (recovering from logging and overgrazing prior to the area's inclusion in the National Park System in the 1930s), and surrounded by the Chihuahuan Desert. Two Mexican towns (Boquillas and Santa Elena) border the park; and cross-border access was reopened in 2011.

Etymology
One of the multiple possibilities of the origin of the name is the option that it stems from hechizos, a Castilian word meaning "enchantment". Another possibility is the option that the word originated from chisos, a Native American word meaning "ghost" or "spirit".

Peaks
Emory Peak 
Lost Mine Peak 
Toll Mountain 
Casa Grande Peak

Climate
Elevation:

Wildlife 

 Ornithology
 Birds of the Chisos Mountains include 81 total known species that live within six different plant associations.  The six plant associations along with the number of known species within them include: the Arroyo-Mesquite-Acacia Association (31 species), the Lechuguilla-Creosotebush-Cactus Association (13 species), the Sotol-Grass Association (32 species), the Deciduous Woodland Association (42 species), the Pinyon-Juniper-Oak Association (32 Species), and the Cypress-Pine-Oak Association (24 species).
 Myrmecology
 Ants of the Chisos Mountains include 81 total known species within 29 different genera.

See also
Beach Mountains
Big Bend (Texas)
Chihuahuan Desert
Sierra Madre Oriental pine–oak forests

References

External links

Geologic Map of the Chisos Mountain, Big Bend National Park United States Geological Survey

Landforms of Brewster County, Texas
Mountain ranges of Texas
Big Bend National Park